The cardinal myzomela (Myzomela cardinalis) is a species of bird in the honeyeater family Meliphagidae. It is named for the scarlet color of the male. It is found in American Samoa, New Caledonia, Samoa, Solomon Islands, and Vanuatu, as well as some islands in Micronesia such as Yap. Its natural habitats are subtropical or tropical moist lowland forest and subtropical or tropical mangrove forest. It frequents areas with flowers, such as gardens. Males are red and black in coloration, females are grayish-olive, sometimes with a red cap or red head. Its long, curved bill is especially adapted for reaching into flowers for nectar. Cardinal myzomela populations have vanished from the island of Guam since the invasion of the brown tree snake.

References

cardinal myzomela
Birds of Samoa
Birds of American Samoa
Birds of the Solomon Islands
Birds of Vanuatu
Birds of New Caledonia
cardinal myzomela
cardinal myzomela
Taxonomy articles created by Polbot